is an urban expressway in Nagoya and Kiyosu, Aichi, Japan. It is a part of the Nagoya Expressway network and is owned and operated by Nagoya Expressway Public Corporation.

Overview

The route originates from a junction with the Ring Route and extends northward to a junction with the Higashi-Meihan Expressway. Past this junction, Route 16 serves as an extension of Route 6 to Ichinomiya (a separate toll is required).

The route was completed in December 2007. As of March 2008 it is the most recent addition to the Nagoya Expressway network. It is 4 lanes for its entire length.

Interchange list

 JCT - junction, TB - toll gate

References

External links
 Nagoya Expressway Public Corporation

Nagoya Expressway